On 5 October 2022, a bus carrying 47 people rammed into the back of KSRTC bus in Vadakkencherry, Palakkad district of Kerala at night. 9 people (5 students, 1 teacher and 4 travelers in the KSRTC bus) were killed and 38 were injured in the accident. The accident occurred due to the over speed of the bus and the driver's negligence. On further investigation it was found that the speed governor of the bus had detached from its fitting.

Aftermath
After the accident, Kerala high court registered a case suo motu and criticized the transport department for not making strict safety norms for private bus operators.

References

2022 disasters in India
2022 road incidents
2020s in Kerala